Sword Dancer (April 24, 1956 – November 16, 1984) was an American Hall of Fame Champion Thoroughbred racehorse. He was the leading American colt of his generation and was voted United States Horse of the Year in 1959.

Background
Sword Dancer was a small chestnut horse bred and owned by Isabel Dodge Sloane's Brookmeade Stable. He was trained by J. Elliott Burch.

Racing career
Sword Dancer won three times in fourteen starts at age two.  At age three, he began to develop and in the 1959 Kentucky Derby was beaten by a nose by Tomy Lee in a stretch duel.  When Tomy Lee did not compete in the Preakness Stakes, his jockey Bill Shoemaker rode Sword Dancer to a second-place finish behind Royal Orbit. In the Belmont Stakes on June 13, Sword Dancer got the better of what was described as a "bitter stretch duel" with Bagdad to win by three-quarters of a length on a muddy track. The colt also won a number of other major races, including a defeat of Hillsdale in the Woodward Stakes. He also defeated 1958 Horse Of The Year Round Table for a second time (he was third in the Woodward), beating him by seven lengths in the Jockey Club Gold Cup at Aqueduct Racetrack. His performance throughout 1959 earned him Horse of the Year honors from all three of the major awarding bodies.

After a slow start at age four, Sword Dancer came on to win four important races out of his twelve starts. In one of his most notable performances, he won a second Woodward Stakes in track record time of 2:01.2 in September, beating a field that included Bald Eagle and T. V. Lark.

Stud record
An ankle injury in the Man O' War Stakes ended his racing career and he was retired to stand at stud at Darby Dan Farm. Sword Dancer notably sired the Hall of Fame colt Damascus, and the filly Lady Pitt, the 1966 American Champion Three-Year-Old Filly. He was later sent to a breeding farm in France, and continued stud duties through 1976. Almost exactly 25 years from his Jockey Gold Cup win, which ended his Eclipse Award Year, he died in his sleep peacefully of natural causes at 28 years old.

Honors
In 1977, Sword Dancer was inducted into the United States' National Museum of Racing and Hall of Fame. His portrait by equine artist Richard Stone Reeves can be seen in the museum's collection.

Pedigree

References

 Sword Dancer's pedigree and racing stats
 Sword Dancer at the United States' National Museum of Racing and Hall of Fame

1956 racehorse births
1984 racehorse deaths
Racehorses bred in Virginia
Racehorses trained in the United States
Belmont Stakes winners
American Thoroughbred Horse of the Year
United States Thoroughbred Racing Hall of Fame inductees
Thoroughbred family 1-o